Animality may refer to:

The essence of animals
Animality studies,  an academic field focused on the cultural study of animals
Animality, a variant of the Fatality in the Mortal Kombat video games

See also
Animalia (disambiguation)
Animal (disambiguation)